Anniversary is a 1963 Canadian short documentary film produced by the National Film Board of Canada and directed by William Weintraub. 

Created to mark the 60th anniversary of the release of the first Canadian narrative drama film, Hiawatha, the Messiah of the Ojibway, in 1903, the film presented an overview of the history of Canadian contributions to cinema, including archival footage of Canadian actors such as Mary Pickford, Marie Dressler, Mack Sennett, Norma Shearer, Fay Wray, Deanna Durbin and Walter Huston. It was narrated by Walter Pidgeon.

The film won the Canadian Film Award for Best Theatrical Short Film at the 16th Canadian Film Awards in 1964.

References

External links

Anniversary at the National Film Board of Canada

Canadian short documentary films
Best Theatrical Short Film Genie and Canadian Screen Award winners
National Film Board of Canada short films
1963 short films
1960s short documentary films
1960s English-language films
Films directed by William Weintraub
1960s Canadian films